Ayun Halliday is an American writer and actor.

She is best known as the author and illustrator (or, as Halliday herself terms it, "the chief primatologist") of the long-running zine The East Village Inky. The zine got its name from Halliday's living in New York City's East Village, and "Inky" being the nickname of her then-infant daughter India.

Her first graphic novel, Peanut, was published in December 2012 and was positively reviewed by The New York Times.

Early life
Halliday was born in Indianapolis, Indiana. She attended Park Tudor School and Northwestern University, where she obtained a degree in theater performance. She is also a licensed massage therapist, who completed her training at the Chicago School of Massage Therapy. After graduating, she joined the Neo-Futurists, an experimental theater troupe in Chicago. It was during her tenure with the troupe that she met her husband, playwright Greg Kotis.

Personal life
She lives in East Harlem, New York. She and Kotis have two children: India (born 1997) and Milo (born 2000).

Halliday and Kotis are co-founders of Theater of the Apes.

Halliday created and hosts Necromancers of the Public Domain, a monthly performance series in New York City, wherein a dusty book from the New York Society Library is turned in a low budget variety show.

Published books
The Big Rumpus (published in the UK as Mama Lama Ding Dong) (2002)
No Touch Monkey! And Other Travel Lessons Learned Too Late (2003)
Job Hopper (2005)
Dirty Sugar Cookies: Culinary Observations, Questionable Taste (2006)
Always Lots of Heinies at the Zoo (2009)
The Zinester's Guide to NYC (2010)
Peanut (2012)
Creative, Not Famous: The Small Potato Manifesto (2022)
Creative, Not Famous Activity Book (2023)

Plays
Farang (1992)
Bagel: Anatomy as Simile (1994)
Too Much Light Makes the Baby Go Blind (1989-1998)
The Mermaid's Legs (2014)
Fawnbook (2015)
Zamboni Godot (2017)
Nurse! (2018)

References

External links
Official website
Dirty Sugar Cookies food blog
Whogoslavia? travel blog
2006 Interview with Ayun

Theater of the Apes website
New York Times "Vows" column
Why Mommy Drinks podcast Ayun Halliday: What the Freakin' Fudge?

Living people
American women bloggers
American bloggers
American memoirists
American humorists
American children's writers
Writers from Indianapolis
20th-century American dramatists and playwrights
1965 births
21st-century American women writers
20th-century American non-fiction writers
21st-century American non-fiction writers
20th-century American women writers
American women memoirists
Women humorists
People from East Harlem
People from the East Village, Manhattan